William Winter Payne (January 2, 1807 – September 2, 1874) was a U.S. Representative from Alabama.

Early life and education
Born at "Granville," near Warrenton, Virginia, Payne completed preparatory studies. He studied law but never practiced.

Career

Payne moved to Franklin County, Alabama, in 1825 and engaged in planting. He served as member of the State house of representatives in 1831. He moved to Sumter County, Alabama. He was again a member of the State house of representatives 1836-1839. He was an unsuccessful candidate for the State senate in 1839. Payne was elected as a Democrat to the Twenty-seventh, Twenty-eighth, and Twenty-ninth Congresses (March 4, 1841 – March 3, 1847). He served as chairman of the Committee on Elections (Twenty-eighth Congress). He was an unsuccessful candidate for reelection in 1846 to the Thirtieth Congress.

Later life and death
Payne returned to Virginia in 1847 and engaged in planting near Warrenton. He served as chairman of the Democratic State convention in 1859. He died in Warrenton, Virginia on September 2, 1874. He was interred in the City Cemetery.

References

External links

1807 births
1874 deaths
People from Warrenton, Virginia
Democratic Party members of the United States House of Representatives from Alabama
Democratic Party members of the Alabama House of Representatives
19th-century American politicians